is a Prefectural Natural Park in central Hokkaidō, Japan. Established as a Prefectural Park in 1955 and redesignated a Prefectural Natural Park in 1958, the park spans the municipalities of Ashibetsu, Furano, Mikasa, Minamifurano, and Yūbari.

See also
 National Parks of Japan
 Lake Akkeshi

References

External links
  Map of Natural Parks of Hokkaidō
  Map of Furano-Ashibetsu Prefectural Natural Park

Parks and gardens in Hokkaido
Protected areas established in 1955
1955 establishments in Japan